King Salmon may refer to:
Chinook salmon, fish
King Salmon (video game), a 1992 video game for the Sega Genesis/Mega Drive

Places
King Salmon, Alaska
 King Salmon Airport, a state owned, public use airport southeast of King Salmon, Alaska
King Salmon, California
King Salmon Creek, in British Columbia, Canada, a tributary of the Taku River
King Salmon Mountain, British Columbia, Canada
King Salmon Lake, British Columbia, Canada

See also 
 King Salmon River (disambiguation)